James Holt Marsh (31 October 1865 – 1 August 1928), was first a Scotland international rugby union player; and then an England international rugby union player. He played club rugby for Edinburgh Institution F.P., Edinburgh University and Swinton; and provincial rugby for Edinburgh District and East of Scotland District. He is the only player to have represented two international teams in the Home Nations Championship. He was a General Practitioner by profession, holding a practice in Manchester for nearly forty years.

Rugby Union career

Amateur career

Born in Rumworth, near Swinton in England, Marsh was schooled in Scotland. Marsh was educated at Edinburgh Institute before being accepted at Edinburgh University to study medicine.

At the time of his Scotland call up, Marsh was playing club rugby for Edinburgh Institution F.P., and was brought in at three-quarters.

He moved to play for Edinburgh University in 1890. This did not go down well with his former club and the Athletic News of 27 October 1890 reported:
Some rather bitter things are being said in Edinburgh about James Marsh, the Swintonian, preferring to play for Edinburgh University instead of with his old colleagues in the Edinburgh Institution Club.

This prompted a move to England that same season; and he then played for Swinton.

Provincial career

He played for Edinburgh District against Glasgow District in the 1886 inter-city match. He also played for Edinburgh in the 1887 and 1888 fixtures.

He played for East of Scotland District in their match against West of Scotland District on 29 January 1887. He also played in the 1888 and 1889 fixtures.

Almost immediately on his move to Swinton, he was playing in the Lancashire versus Yorkshire match on 29 November 1890. He was noted as a Edinburgh University three-quarter and also as playing for Swinton. Lancashire won the match.

After his move to England, it was during the 1890–91 season his strong club play brought him to the attention of the English selectors, and he was brought into England's annual North vs. South match.

International career

In 1889, Marsh was selected for the Scottish international team when he was chosen to face Wales as part of the 1890 Home Nations Championship.  Scotland beat Wales and Marsh was reselected for the second, and final game of the competition, away to Ireland at Belfast. With England having withdrawn from the tournament, a win over the Irish would give Scotland the Home Nations, but not the Grand Slam. Scotland won the match thanks to a single dropped goal from Henry Stevenson.

His move to England and his form for Swinton led to Marsh being selected for the 1892 Home Nations Championship for England in the game against Ireland, playing again at threequarters alongside Dicky Lockwood and George Hubbard. The English team was victorious, but Marsh was not selected for the team again. It is unknown if this was due to sanctions or actions taken by the rugby unions or if it was a selection choice.

Rugby League career

When Swinton converted from the rugby union code to the rugby league code on Tuesday 2 June 1896, Marsh would have been approximately 30 years of age. Consequently, he may have been both a rugby union and rugby league footballer for Swinton.

Medical career

After qualifying as a doctor, Marsh moved to Manchester to set up a medical practice.

Bibliography

References

External links
Search for "Marsh" at rugbyleagueproject.org
Search for "James Holt Marsh" at britishnewspaperarchive.co.uk
Search for "James Marsh" at britishnewspaperarchive.co.uk

1865 births
1928 deaths
Alumni of the University of Edinburgh
Edinburgh University RFC players
England international rugby union players
Edinburgh District (rugby union) players
Rugby union players from Greater Manchester
Scotland international rugby union players
Scottish rugby union players
Swinton Lions players
Edinburgh Institution F.P. players
East of Scotland District players
Lancashire County RFU players
Rugby union three-quarters